Angel Robinson (born 1989)  is a Minnesota native basketball forward. She registered in 134 games and started all but two games of her career. Robinson completed her career at MU as the only player in program history with over 1,500 points, 500 assists and 250 steals. She ranks in the top 12 in eight career statistical categories, including an MU-record 134 career games played. Robinson was selected First Team selection and WBCA All-America Team finalist. She was also a two time ALL-BIG EAST First Team selection and a member of the 2008 ALL- BIG EAST Freshman team. The American forward was drafted 22nd overall by the New York Liberty in 2011 WNBA Draft and traded to the Minnesota Lynx, who released her before the season began. She also signed a one-year deal to play for Ceyhan-Belediyesi SC in the Adana Province of Turkey. Robinson spent time playing for Telge in Sweden and currently plays in Switzerland.

Marquette University
Career Notes: Played in 134 career games and started in all but two games of her career, including the last 105 straight ... First player in Marquette history with over 1,500 points, 500 assists and 250 steals ... Ranks in the top 12 in eight career statistical categories, including a MU-record 134 career games played ... Stands second on the career steals (277), free throws made (434) and free throws attempted (600) lists, third in assists (570), sixth in points (1,699), eighth in field goals made (587) and 12th in rebounds (640) ... Drafted 22nd overall by the New York Liberty in the 2011 WNBA Draft.

Marquette  statistics
Source

High School Basketball
Prior to Marquette: 2007 Minnesota Miss Basketball ... Averaged 16.3 points, 5.3 assists and 4.9 steals per game while leading St. Paul Central to the Minnesota AAAA State Championship and an undefeated season in 2006-07 ... Set the Minnesota State steals record with 776 for her career ... Was a first team all-state selection in 2007 as well as the Minneapolis Star Tribune's Metro Player of the Year ... Ranked as high as No. 24 (overall prospect) by All-Star Girls Report and the fourth best point guard overall by the publication ... No. 49 by scout.com ... Participated in the Adidas Top 10 All-American Camp ... Also lettered as a member of the cross country and track teams.

Awards and honors
 2013 Eurobasket.com All-Swedish Damligan All-Imports Team 
 2013 Eurobasket.com All-Swedish Damligan Honorable Mention
 2013 Swedish Damligan Regular Season Champion 
 2011 Drafted to the Minnesota Lynx
 2010-11 All-BIG EAST First Team Selection
 2009-10 All-BIG EAST Second Team Selection
 2008-09 All-BIG EAST Second Team Selection
 2008 NIT Champion 
 2007-08 All-BIG EAST Freshman Team Selection
 2007 First Team All-State Selection 
 Minneapolis Star Tribune's Metro Player of the Year

References

External links
http://www.gomarquette.com/sports/w-baskbl/spec-rel/041111aaa.html
http://www.gomarquette.com/sports/w-baskbl/mtt/robinson_angel00.html
http://www.gomarquette.com/sports/w-baskbl/stats/2010-2011/teamcume.html
http://www.gomarquette.com/sports/w-baskbl/mtt/robinson_angel00.html

Living people
1989 births
American women's basketball players
Basketball players from Minnesota
Marquette Golden Eagles women's basketball players
New York Liberty draft picks
Forwards (basketball)